Rupp Arena at Central Bank Center is an arena located in downtown Lexington, Kentucky, United States. Since its opening in 1976, it has been the centerpiece of Central Bank Center (formerly Lexington Center), a convention and shopping facility owned by an arm of the Lexington-Fayette Urban County Government, which is located next to the Lexington Hyatt and Hilton hotels. Rupp Arena also serves as home court to the University of Kentucky men's basketball program, and is named after legendary former Kentucky coach Adolph Rupp with an official capacity of 20,500. In 2014 and 2015, in Rupp Arena, the Kentucky Wildcats men's basketball team was second in the nation in college basketball home attendance. Rupp Arena also regularly hosts concerts, conventions and shows.

History
The arena's primary tenant is the Kentucky Wildcats men's basketball team, with the Kentucky Wildcats women's basketball team hosting rivalry and power program opponent games at the venue in recent years. Rupp Arena was the host of the 1985 NCAA Final Four, won in an upset by eighth-seeded Villanova.  It also formerly hosted the Kentucky Thoroughblades (currently the San Jose Barracuda) (capacity 10,011) and the Lexington Men O' War (capacity 7,500) minor-league hockey teams, and the Lexington Horsemen arena football team (capacity 7,550), numerous concerts (theater capacity 2,300; concert hall 10,000; arena capacity 20,500 approx.), conventions, and other events. It is named after University of Kentucky coaching legend Adolph Rupp, and opened in 1976, a little more than a year before Rupp's death in late 1977. Since the 1985 Final Four, Rupp Arena has hosted a number of NCAA Tournament regional games, most recently in 2013 when it hosted second and third round NCAA Tournament games. Rupp Arena is also home to Kentucky's high school boys' basketball Sweet Sixteen, a single-elimination tournament which determines the state champion with sixteen teams representing each of Kentucky's regional high school champions.

On January 27, 2020, it was announced that Lexington Center's overall naming rights were sold to Central Bank, a local community bank, by the Lexington Center Corporation and JMI Sports, which handles the multimedia rights for both the LCC and the University of Kentucky. The Rupp name will continue to receive primacy in the fourteen-year agreement for the arena portion of the complex, and be known as "Rupp Arena at Central Bank Center". Floor signage indicating the new naming arrangement was installed on Rupp Arena's basketball floor in time for the 2020-21 season.

Kentucky Basketball at Rupp Arena

Fan Support

Enthusiastic fan participation has been central to the Kentucky Basketball experience for decades, both prior to and during the Rupp Arena years. Crowds at Rupp Arena are usually full and enthusiastic, particularly for rivalry games (e.g., Louisville, Tennessee, and formerly, Indiana) and against Blue Blood opponents (e.g., North Carolina, Kansas).

Kentucky fans are passionate in their support, but also have a long-standing tradition of giving standing ovations near the end of games to opponents who turn in exceptional performances. These opponents include David Robinson, Billy Cunningham, Austin Carr, Pete Maravich, Bubba Parnham, Chris Jackson, Shaquille O'Neal, Elston Turner, Jr., Lawrence Roberts, and Freeman Williams.

Fans take pride in never having rushed the court after a Kentucky victory, a nod to their generally lofty expectations of the program and perception that no Kentucky victory is ever truly an upset. Season tickets remain in high demand. Fans report that it can take more than 20 years to improve their seat location by just a few rows. Owing to the constant demand for tickets, seating at Rupp Arena for Kentucky games is notable for having very few students near the floor.

Kentucky fans additionally take pride in the fact that their standard for team banner-hanging is very high. They typically only hang banners for teams who reached the Final Four. They additionally take pride in not hanging banners for non-competitive championships, such as Helms Titles.

Kentucky fans often identify the following contests as being among the loudest in Rupp Arena history:

1979 vs. Kansas (Dwight Anderson and Kyle Macy spark a miraculous late comeback)
1981 vs. LSU (Before the game LSU center Greg Cook quipped "Kentucky ain't nothin' but a name." Legendary play by play announcer Cawood Ledford opened his broadcast saying, "Them's fighting' words." Kentucky beat #2 LSU on Senior Day, featuring Sam Bowie's half-court alley-oop dunk and game saving block; LSU's first SEC loss of the season. NBC commentator Al Maguire said the crowd was "so loud, it's scary.")
1983 vs. Louisville (Regular attendees at Rupp Arena say this and the 1981 LSU contest were the two most frenzied game-time atmospheres in the history of the Rupp Arena; two top-10 teams battled it out, with Kentucky prevailing, avenging their "Dream Game" loss to Louisville the year before).
1984 vs. Houston (Kentucky beats eventual National Runner-Up Houston and Hakeem Olajuwon)
1990 vs. LSU (Overmatched, on probation, and scholarship-decimated Kentucky beats an LSU team featuring Chris Jackson, Shaquille O'Neal, and Stanley Roberts)
1990 vs. Kansas (Kentucky exacts revenge for a humiliating loss to Kansas the year before; a 20–0 run inside 10 minutes electrified the crowd; ESPN's Larry Conley remarked "Now I know what those people felt like when they went up against the lions at the Roman Coliseum.")
1992 vs. Tennessee (Senior Day for Kentucky's famed "The Unforgettables" and Cawood Ledford's final home game; a 3-point barrage by Kentucky and a scuffle between Sean Woods and a Tennessee player energized the fans)
1998 vs. Maryland (Kentucky rattles hotshot Steve Francis after he and Kentucky's Jamaal Magloire traded barbs in the newspapers in the weeks leading up to the game)
2001 vs. North Carolina (Tayshaun Prince hits five 3-pointers in a row; his fifth basket from near the logo at center court marked what is likely the loudest single moment in Rupp Arena history; Bill Raftery of CBS exclaimed "Tayshaun is not a prince, he's a king.")
2001 vs. Louisville (A frenzied crowd lays in to Rick Pitino on his return to Rupp as coach of the Cardinals)
2003 vs. Florida (Kentucky blows out #1 Florida; ESPN's Dick Vitale remarked "What a way to be number #1, to come to Rupp Arena.")
2011 vs. North Carolina (Anthony Davis blocks John Henson's would-be game winner)

Traditions

In addition to impassioned support, other Rupp Arena Kentucky Basketball traditions include

Fans congregating in the lobby area of the adjacent Hyatt Regency Hotel and other downtown restaurants, a basketball variation on football tailgating.
Cheering extra loudly for Kentucky players who are from Kentucky.
The famous "C-A-T-S, Cats, Cats, Cats" and "Go Big Blue" cheers.
The "Y": After the Kentucky Cheerleaders spell out the "K-E-N-T-U-C-K" of "Kentucky", a mystery celebrity will come onto the court making the "Y" shape by holding both arms in the air, with enthusiastic applause. Previous "Y" guests have included former Kentucky players, and celebrities, such as LeBron James
Waking up early and filling Rupp Arena for Big Blue Madness and College Gameday experiences.

Cheerleaders

The Kentucky Cheerleading squad is the most successful in the history of competitive collegiate cheerleading, having won 23 titles and 25 co-ed titles as of 2022. Kentucky has won more UCA Division-1 cheerleading titles than all other universities combined. Their most iconic stunt is the "2001: A Space Odyssey Theme", a rotating pyramid performed in conjunction with the pep band for decades.

Pep Band

The University of Kentucky Pep Band is one of the largest in the nation and is an essential part of the Kentucky basketball gameday experience. The band traditionally plays the opening bars of "The Lone Ranger Theme" leading into "On, On, U of K" (Kentucky's official fight song) just prior to tipoff, and plays a trumpet cheer just seconds before the jump ball. Kentucky's secondary fight song, "Kentucky Fight", is typically played in the pre-game, during the second half, or, on occasion, when the team is struggling. Other favorites through the years have been covers of "Hold On, I'm Coming", "Thriller", "Back in the "U.S.S.R.", "Leapfrog," "Hey Baby", "Blue Moon of Kentucky", and "Rock n Roll, Part 2." At game's end, the band always plays Stephen Foster's "My Old Kentucky Home", the Kentucky state song.

Seating arrangement
The arena has an official capacity for basketball of 20,545 following a 2019 renovation project that was part of a larger renovation and expansion of Lexington Center. The most significant change to the arena was the installation of chairback seats in about half of the upper seating bowl.

Before the 2019 renovation, the official capacity was 23,500, but because of the former all-bleacher configuration of the upper seating bowl, it was able to pack in more than 24,000 for many UK basketball games. The lower bowl also incorporates a student standing-room area called the "eRUPPtion Zone" behind one goal. Unlike many arenas built in the following years, it has no luxury suites, and has never been renovated to add them. However, in 2001, the arena received some minor renovations including four oversized video boards, new lower bowl seating, new locker rooms, and a new court.

Milestones
The first act to perform at Rupp Arena was Lawrence Welk on October 17, 1976. The performance attracted 20,000 people to the newly opened facility.
Rupp Arena was set to host Elvis Presley live in concert on August 23, 1977. However, Presley died on August 16, exactly one week before the concert was scheduled.
The ceremonial first basket in the new facility was sunk by Adolph's young grandson Chip (Adolph III), who went on to play college basketball at Southeastern Conference (SEC) rival Vanderbilt.
Rupp Arena is the home court of the Kentucky Wildcats men's basketball team, which boasts an overall record in Rupp Arena of 529-64 (.892) since beginning play there on November 27, 1976. Their last loss was on March 3, 2020, to rival Tennessee. The court itself is named Cawood's Court after longtime University of Kentucky football and men's basketball radio broadcaster Cawood Ledford.
Rupp staged three Southeastern Conference men's basketball tournaments between 1982 and 1993; it was also the host of the Ohio Valley Conference men's basketball tournament in 1992 and 1993.
It hosted WWE Backlash in 2006.
The Rupp Arena attendance record was set on January 2, 2010, when 24,480 people watched #3 Kentucky play rival Louisville. The final score was a 71–62 victory by the Kentucky Wildcats. 

The UK men are the only basketball program in the SEC that plays home games in an off-campus facility. All of the other programs play on campus, including the UK women, who play in the men's former home of Memorial Coliseum. However, when the women's program expects an unusually large crowd, it will shift an occasional game to Rupp.
Rupp is also home to the annual KHSAA State Basketball Championship, known and trademarked as the Sweet Sixteen, with 16 boys' basketball teams from throughout the commonwealth appearing for a shot at the state title. The KHSAA girls' Sweet Sixteen will join the boys' event at Rupp in 2019.
The University of Kentucky has led the nation 25 times in NCAA men's basketball home attendance (an NCAA record) since the 1976–77 season (the previous 39 seasons at Rupp Arena), including 17 out of the last 20 seasons, and eight of the last 10 seasons. 
On December 21, 2009, in Rupp Arena, the Kentucky men's basketball team became the first college basketball program to win 2,000 games, in an 88–44 win against the Drexel University Dragons. 
On November 8, 2010, ESPN ranked Rupp Arena as the third-loudest venue in college basketball.
Rupp Arena hosted the August 2, 2011, tapings of SmackDown and WWE Superstars, with the former set to air on August 5, 2011, and the latter having aired on August 4, 2011.
The arena hosted several TV tapings for various WWF shows in the 1980s and 1990s.
The 500th win in Rupp Arena came on November 27, 2013, against Eastern Michigan, with Kentucky winning 81–63.
Before the 2019 renovation, it was Kentucky's largest arena, and has hosted concerts by many performers, including Paul McCartney, Genesis, Elton John, The Rolling Stones, The Grateful Dead, Rush, George Strait, Billy Joel, Guns N' Roses, Tim McGraw, Phish, Garth Brooks, CKY, Bob Seger, Trans-Siberian Orchestra, and in recent years, Pearl Jam, Taylor Swift, Drake, Brad Paisley, Morgan Wallen and Miranda Lambert.
On January 28, 2017, with #4 Kentucky hosting #2 Kansas at Rupp Arena, the Guinness Book of World Records measured the loudest indoor crowd roar at 126.4 dB. It lasted 17 days before Guinness recorded a roar of 130.4 dB at Allen Fieldhouse when West Virginia played at Kansas.

2015 renovations

Rupp Arena was approved for various renovations in 2015 to improve the fan experience and to attract more concerts and major events. The approved renovations totaled at $15.8 million that included a new center-hung scoreboard, advertising ribbon boards, wireless internet for fans, and improved roof infrastructure.

The entire list of renovations as stated on UK Athletics' website include:
 State-of-the-art Daktronics center-hung video board
 15mm ribbon boards
 Replaced 16mm LED corner video boards with 6mm LED video boards to produce HD quality image
 L-Acoustics K2 line array sound system
 Total sanding and repainting of the floor to reflect UK's updated branding and logo
 New basketball goals and new shot clocks
 Added press box seating to the east side of the arena
 Replaced LED scorer's table with 6mm version and moved the old 10mm scorer's table to the opposite side of the floor for radio broadcast seating
 Replaced static ad panels in lower four corners of the arena with LED ad panels

NCAA Tournament games

 2013 Second and Third Rounds
 2007 First and Second Rounds
 2002 South Regional Semi-finals and Final
 1998 First and Second Rounds
1996 Southeast Regional Semi-finals and Final 
 1994 First and Second Rounds
 1992 Southeast Regional Semi-finals and Final 
 1989 Southeast Regional Semi-finals and Final 
 1985 NCAA Final Four
 1984 Mideast Regional Semi-finals and Final 
 1980 Mideast Regional Semi-finals and Final 
 1977 Mideast Regional Semi-finals and Final

Attendance record progression
The Kentucky Wildcats have set or broken the Rupp Arena attendance record 24 times since the arena opened in 1976. In those games, the Wildcats have won 20 times and lost 4 times.

See also
 List of NCAA Division I basketball arenas

References

External links
 
 Rupp Arena, Arts & Entertainment District

1976 establishments in Kentucky
Basketball venues in Kentucky
College basketball venues in the United States
Convention centers in Kentucky
Event venues established in 1976
Indoor ice hockey venues in the United States
Kentucky Thoroughblades
Kentucky Wildcats basketball venues
Sports venues in Lexington, Kentucky
Sports venues completed in 1976
Indoor arenas in Kentucky
NCAA Division I men's basketball tournament Final Four venues